The cycling competitions at the 2022 Mediterranean Games was held on 30 June and 2 July 2022 in Oran, Algeria.

Medal summary

Medalists

Medal table

References

External links
2022 Mediterranean Games – Cycling Road
Results book

Sports at the 2022 Mediterranean Games
2022
Mediterranean Games